Pladda Lighthouse is an active 18th century lighthouse situated at the southern end of the island of Pladda in western Scotland. The lighthouse dates from 1790 and was designed by Thomas Smith. It was the first light on the Clyde to be commissioned by the Commissioners of the Northern Lights. It had both an upper and a lower light to distinguish it from the three other lighthouses in the Firth of Clyde. 

In 1876, Pladda was about the third station to have a foghorn. The "double lights" were replaced by a powerful flashing system in 1901. Lightkeepers were withdrawn in 1990 when the lighthouse was automated; it is now remotely monitored from the Northern Lighthouse Board's headquarters in Edinburgh.

In popular culture
Pladda and its lighthouse feature extensively in Peter Hill's book Stargazing: Memoirs of a Young Lighthouse Keeper. They were also filming locations for "Queen Victoria Syndrome", the first episode of season 5 of The Crown.

See also

 List of lighthouses in Scotland
 List of Northern Lighthouse Board lighthouses

Notes

External links

 Northern Lighthouse Board

Lighthouses completed in 1790
Towers completed in 1790
Lighthouses of Scottish islands
1790 establishments in Scotland
Geography of North Ayrshire